Bortolo "Tas" Baitieri (born 17 September 1958) is an Australian former professional rugby league footballer who played in the 1970s and 1980s, and coached in the 1980s and 1990s. He played for the Penrith Panthers, Canterbury-Bankstown Bulldogs in Australia and Paris Châtillon XIII in France. He was later the coach of the French national side.

Playing career
Playing in the forwards, Baitieri played with the Penrith Panthers and the Canterbury-Bankstown Bulldogs in Australia, spending the off-seasons in France playing for Paris Châtillon XIII.

Coaching career
Baitieri was appointed as coach of the French national side in 1985. He was dismissed from the role in 1987 amid economic issues for the French Rugby League Federation.

Several years later, Baitieri returned to Australia and coached and player-coached the Cumberland College of Health Sciences (now a faculty of the University of Sydney) Rugby League team in the NSW University Rugby League Competition. The Cumberland side won the 1991 2nd division grandfinal (defeating the University of Newcastle) in their first season under Baitieri and the side was subsequently elevated to the first division where the "Cumbo Cunnies" finished grand finalists in their first season in the top division.  At the end of season 1991, The Cumberland Rugby League Club announced that the Best & Fairest player award would be renamed and called the Tas Baitieri shield in recognition of the efforts and leadership by Baitieri toward his young charges and the esteem in which he was held by players.

Administration and development roles
In 1985, Baitieri attended the RLIB meeting in Paris as a translator for French Rugby League Federation chairman .

In 1993, Baitieri was appointed as Victoria Rugby League's development officer by the Australian Rugby League.

Baitieri was the chief executive of the short-lived French Super League club, Paris Saint-Germain.

He is also a development officer for the Rugby League International Federation.

Baitieri was a development officer for the National Rugby League until he was made redundant in 2020.

In 2022, Baitieri was the team manager of the Italian national team at the 2021 Rugby League World Cup.

Personal life
Baitieri's son, Jason, is also a professional rugby league footballer.

References

External links
Bulldogs profile. 
 

1958 births
Living people
Place of birth missing (living people)
Australian rugby league players
Australian people of Italian descent
Penrith Panthers players
Canterbury-Bankstown Bulldogs players
Australian rugby league coaches
France national rugby league team coaches
Australian rugby league administrators
Rugby league second-rows
Rugby league props